Matsirga Waterfalls (Fantswam: Ka̱byek Tityong; Hausa: Matsirga; English: River Wonderful) is a waterfall located at Batadon (Hausa: Madakiya) a small settlement in Madakiya Ward, Zangon Kataf LGA, southern Kaduna State, Nigeria.

The waterfall has its source from the springs on Kagoro hills which cascade from four different hollows of about 25 metres rock cliff to form a large pool at its bottom.

Location
The waterfall drops from a cliff of 30 meters height into a gorge surrounded by rocks. Matsirga Waterfalls cascades from a face of sheer rock through four natural funnels. It's about 30 meters tall and falls into a large plunge pool at the bottom. Locals refer to the stream that feeds into the falls as "the River Wonderful".

The surrounding area of the Matsirga waterfalls has been described as "outstanding natural beauty, which is both tranquil and breathtakingly beautiful".

See also
List of waterfalls

References

External links

Kaduna State
Waterfalls of Nigeria
Tourist attractions in Kaduna State